Lantana is a fabric blended from typically 80% cotton and 20% wool.

It may be associated with the Liberty's department store on Regent Street, London.

See also
 Textiles
 Textile manufacturing
 Cloth
 Linen

References

External links
 Range of Lantana fabrics
 Range of Lantana fabrics

Woven fabrics
Woollen industry